In Celtic mythology, Clota was the patron goddess of the River Clyde. Perhaps worshiped by the local Welsh-speaking Damnonii tribe who held the territory which later was to become the Kingdom of Strathclyde. The Damnonii allied themselves with Rome who recorded and mapped the Clota estuary. During the Antonine period the Romans built the Antonine Wall from the Forth to the Clyde and created a causeway stretching across the 'Clota' which linked the forts at Bishopton, Greenock and Largs, to the Antonine Wall.

External links 
 https://www.youtube.com/group/clota

Goddesses of the ancient Britons
Sea and river goddesses